Belal Muhammad (born July 9, 1988) is an American mixed martial artist who is currently competing in the UFC welterweight division. A professional since 2012, he has also competed for Bellator and Titan FC. As of October 24, 2022, he is #4 in the UFC welterweight rankings.

Background
Muhammad was born and raised in Chicago, Illinois, to Palestinian parents. He has four siblings: an older brother, older sister and two younger brothers. He wrestled at Bogan High School and attended, but did not complete a degree, at the University of Illinois at Urbana-Champaign.

Mixed martial arts career

Shortly after a TKO victory over Steve Carl to become the Titan Fighting Championships Welterweight Champion, and push his record to 9–0, Muhammad signed with the UFC in 2016.

Ultimate Fighting Championship
On July 7, 2016, at UFC Fight Night 90, Muhammad made his UFC debut, as a short-notice replacement, against Alan Jouban. He lost the fight via unanimous decision. Both participants were awarded Fight of the Night honors for their performances.

Muhammad next faced Augusto Montaño on September 17, 2016 at UFC Fight Night 94. He won the fight via TKO in the third round.

Muhammad was expected to face Lyman Good on November 12, 2016 at UFC 205. However, on October 24, Good was pulled from the card after being notified by USADA of a potential anti-doping violation stemming from an out-of-competition drug test sample collected ten days earlier. He was replaced by Vicente Luque. Muhammad lost the fight via knockout in the first round.

Muhammad was a short notice replacement and stepped in to face Randy Brown on February 11, 2017 at UFC 208. He won the fight by unanimous decision.

Muhammad faced Jordan Mein on July 8, 2017 at UFC 213. He won the fight by unanimous decision.

Muhammad was expected to face Jesse Taylor on November 19, 2017 at UFC Fight Night: Werdum vs. Tybura. However, on September 13, it was announced that Taylor was pulled from the card after being notified by USADA of a potential doping violation stemming from an out-of-competition drug test conducted on August 22. He was replaced by Tim Means. Muhammad won the fight via split decision.

Muhammad was expected to face Niko Price on June 1, 2018 at UFC Fight Night 131. However, Price was removed from the bout on May 22 for undisclosed reasons and replaced by promotional newcomer Chance Rencountre. Muhammad won the fight via unanimous decision.

Muhammad was scheduled to meet Elizeu Zaleski dos Santos on September 22, 2018 at UFC Fight Night 137. However, on September 14, 2018 Muhammad was pulled from the bout and he was replaced by newcomer Luigi Vendramini.

Muhammad faced Geoff Neal on January 19, 2019 at UFC Fight Night 143. He lost the fight by unanimous decision.

Muhammad faced Curtis Millender on April 13, 2019 at UFC 236. He won the fight by unanimous decision.

Muhammad faced Takashi Sato on September 7, 2019 at UFC 242. He won the fight via a rear-naked choke submission in the third round. This win earned Muhammad his first Performance of the Night award.

Muhammad was expected to face Lyman Good on April 18, 2020 at UFC 249. However on April 4, Good pulled out due to COVID-19 infection. The bout was rebooked and eventually took place on June 20, 2020 at UFC on ESPN: Blaydes vs. Volkov. He won the fight via unanimous decision.

Muhammad was expected to face Sean Brady on December 19, 2020 at UFC Fight Night 183. However in late October, Brady had a broken nose and had to pull out of their bout, and he was replaced by Dhiego Lima. Subsequently, Muhammed was diagnosed with COVID-19 during the week leading up to the event and the bout was scrapped from the card  and the bout was rescheduled to February 13, 2021 at UFC 258 Muhammad won the fight via unanimous decision.

Muhammad faced Leon Edwards on March 13, 2021 at UFC Fight Night 187. During the second round, Edwards poked Muhammad in the eye rendering him unable to continue. The fight was declared a no contest.

Muhammad faced Demian Maia on June 12, 2021 at UFC 263. Muhammad won the fight via unanimous decision.

Muhammad faced Stephen Thompson  on December 18, 2021 at UFC Fight Night: Lewis vs. Daukaus. He won the bout via unanimous decision.

Muhammad faced Vicente Luque in a rematch on April 16, 2022 at UFC on ESPN 34. He won the fight via unanimous decision.

Muhammad faced Sean Brady on October 22, 2022 at UFC 280. He won the bout via TKO stoppage at the end of the second round. UFC Hall of Famer and former UFC Lightweight Champion Khabib Nurmagomedov was one of his cornermen for this fight. He received his second Performance of the Night bonus.

Personal life
Muhammad is an outspoken supporter of Palestine. He displays the Palestinian flag during his octagon entrance and post-fight results. He has denounced the Israeli attacks on the Gaza Strip, showing support for Palestinians while also condemning any anti-Semitic responses from protesters.

On June 1, 2020, businesses owned by Muhammad's father and cousins in Chicago were looted and destroyed as a result of the George Floyd unrest.

He threw the ceremonial first pitch for the Chicago Cubs on July 28, 2021.

Muhammad is a Muslim.

Championships and accomplishments
Ultimate Fighting Championship
Performance of the Night (Two times) 
Fight of the Night (One time) 
Fifth highest decision wins per win percentage (10 decision wins / 13 wins - 76.92%)
Tied for sixth most unanimous decision wins in UFC history (9)
Titan Fighting Championship
Titan FC Welterweight Championship (One time)
MMAjunkie.com
2019 January Fight of the Month vs. Geoff Neal

Mixed martial arts record

|-
|Win
|align=center|22–3 (1)
|Sean Brady
|TKO (punches)
|UFC 280
|
|align=center|2
|align=center|4:47
|Abu Dhabi, United Arab Emirates
|
|-
|Win
|align=center|21–3 (1)
|Vicente Luque
|Decision (unanimous)
|UFC on ESPN: Luque vs. Muhammad 2 
|
|align=center|5
|align=center|5:00
|Las Vegas, Nevada, United States
|
|-
|Win
|align=center|20–3 (1)
|Stephen Thompson
|Decision (unanimous)
|UFC Fight Night: Lewis vs. Daukaus
|
|align=center|3
|align=center|5:00
|Las Vegas, Nevada, United States
|
|-
|Win
|align=center|19–3 (1)
|Demian Maia
|Decision (unanimous)
|UFC 263
|
|align=center|3
|align=center|5:00
|Glendale, Arizona, United States
|
|-
|NC
|align=center|18–3 (1)
|Leon Edwards
|NC (accidental eye poke)
|UFC Fight Night: Edwards vs. Muhammad
|
|align=center|2
|align=center|0:18
|Las Vegas, Nevada, United States
|
|-
|Win
|align=center|18–3
|Dhiego Lima
|Decision (unanimous)
|UFC 258 
|
|align=center|3
|align=center|5:00
|Las Vegas, Nevada, United States
|
|-
|Win
|align=center|17–3
|Lyman Good
|Decision (unanimous)
|UFC on ESPN: Blaydes vs. Volkov 
|
|align=center|3
|align=center|5:00
|Las Vegas, Nevada, United States
|
|-
|Win
|align=center|16–3
|Takashi Sato
|Submission (rear-naked choke)
|UFC 242 
|
|align=center|3
|align=center|1:55
|Abu Dhabi, United Arab Emirates
|
|-
|Win
|align=center|15–3
|Curtis Millender
|Decision (unanimous)
|UFC 236 
|
|align=center|3
|align=center|5:00
|Atlanta, Georgia, United States
|
|-
|Loss
|align=center|14–3
|Geoff Neal
|Decision (unanimous)
|UFC Fight Night: Cejudo vs. Dillashaw 
|
|align=center|3
|align=center|5:00
|Brooklyn, New York, United States
|  
|- 
|Win
|align=center|14–2
|Chance Rencountre
|Decision (unanimous)
|UFC Fight Night: Rivera vs. Moraes
|
|align=center|3
|align=center|5:00
|Utica, New York, United States
|
|-
|Win
|align=center|13–2
|Tim Means
|Decision (split)
|UFC Fight Night: Werdum vs. Tybura
|
|align=center|3
|align=center|5:00
|Sydney, Australia
|
|-
|Win
|align=center|12–2
|Jordan Mein
|Decision (unanimous)
|UFC 213 
|
|align=center|3
|align=center|5:00
|Las Vegas, Nevada, United States
|
|-
|Win
|align=center|11–2
|Randy Brown
|Decision (unanimous)
|UFC 208
|
|align=center|3
|align=center|5:00
|Brooklyn, New York, United States
|
|-
|Loss
|align=center|10–2
|Vicente Luque
|KO (punches)
|UFC 205
|
|align=center|1
|align=center|1:19
|New York City, New York, United States
|
|-
|Win
|align=center| 10–1
|Augusto Montaño
|TKO (punches)
|UFC Fight Night: Poirier vs. Johnson
|
|align=center|3
|align=center|4:19
|Hidalgo, Texas, United States
|
|-
|Loss
|align=center| 9–1
|Alan Jouban
|Decision (unanimous)
|UFC Fight Night: dos Anjos vs. Alvarez
|
|align=center| 3
|align=center| 5:00
|Las Vegas, Nevada, United States
|
|-
|Win
|align=center| 9–0
|Steve Carl
|TKO (punches)
|Titan FC 38
|
|align=center| 4
|align=center| 4:07
|Miami, Florida, United States
|
|-
| Win
|align=center| 8–0
|Zane Kamaka
| Decision (unanimous)
|Titan FC 35
|
|align=center|3
|align=center|5:00
|Ridgefield, Washington, United States
|
|-
| Win
|align=center| 7–0
|Keith Johnson
| Decision (unanimous)
|Titan FC 33
|
|align=center|3
|align=center|5:00
|Mobile, Alabama, United States
|
|-
|Win
|align=center| 6–0
|Chris Curtis
|Decision (unanimous)
|Hoosier Fight Club 21
|
|align=center|3
|align=center|5:00
|Valparaiso, Indiana, United States
|
|-
|Win
|align=center| 5–0
|A.J. Matthews
|Decision (unanimous)
|Bellator 112
|
|align=center|3
|align=center|5:00
|Hammond, Indiana, United States
|
|-
|Win
|align=center| 4–0
|Garrett Gross
|Decision (unanimous)
|Hoosier Fight Club 18
|
|align=center|3
|align=center|5:00
|Valparaiso, Indiana, United States
|
|-
|Win
|align=center| 3–0
|Jimmy Fritz
|TKO (punches)
|Hoosier Fight Club 15
|
|align=center|2
|align=center|2:19
|Valparaiso, Indiana, United States
|
|-
|Win
|align=center| 2–0
|Quinton McCottrell
|Decision (unanimous)
|Bellator 84
|
|align=center|3
|align=center|5:00
|Hammond, Indiana, United States
|
|-
|Win
|align=center| 1–0
|Justin Brock
|TKO (punches)
|Hoosier Fight Club 12
|
|align=center|1
|align=center|2:17
|Valparaiso, Indiana, United States
|
|-

See also
 List of current UFC fighters
 List of male mixed martial artists

References

External links
 
 

1988 births
M
Welterweight mixed martial artists
Mixed martial artists utilizing wrestling
Mixed martial artists utilizing Brazilian jiu-jitsu
Living people
Mixed martial artists from Illinois
Sportspeople from Chicago
University of Illinois College of Law alumni
American people of Palestinian descent
American male sport wrestlers
Amateur wrestlers
American practitioners of Brazilian jiu-jitsu
American Muslims
Ultimate Fighting Championship male fighters